The Laredo Lobos were a professional arena football team based out of Laredo, Texas.  They were a member of the af2 league.  They played their home games at the Laredo Entertainment Center.  The team was originally a 2006 expansion member of the Intense Football League.

The Lobos mark the af2's return to the city after the recent failure of the Laredo Law.

However, after getting only 1 win in 2007, along with only 3 wins in two years, the Lobos joined the Law as Laredo's two failed indoor football projects and folded.

Season-By-Season 

|-
| colspan="6" align="center" |  Laredo Lobos (Intense Football League)
|-
|2006 || 2 || 12 || 0 || 6th League || --
|-
| colspan="6" align="center" | Laredo Lobos (af2)
|-
|2007 || 1 || 15 || 0 || 5th NC Southwest || --
|-
!Totals || 3 || 27 || 0
|colspan="2"|
|}

External links 
 Main Site of the Laredo Lobos - Now a parked domain
 Lobos' 2006 Stats
 Laredo Lobos at ArenaFan.com

Defunct af2 teams
Intense Football League teams
Sports in Laredo, Texas
Defunct American football teams in Texas
2005 establishments in Texas
2007 disestablishments in Texas
American football teams established in 2005
American football teams disestablished in 2007